The Day Covered Bridge is a historic Queen post truss covered bridge in Morris Township, Washington County, Pennsylvania. It is 12' by 36'6" and rests on three stone and mortar abutments. It was renovated in 2003, in a project that added steel support beams, a new roof, flooring and sidewalls.

The Day Bridge is covered with vertical plank siding on both sides and portals, and has a sheet metal gable roof.

It is designated as a historic bridge by the Washington County History & Landmarks Foundation.

References

External links
[ National Register nomination form]

Covered bridges on the National Register of Historic Places in Pennsylvania
Covered bridges in Washington County, Pennsylvania
Bridges completed in 1875
National Register of Historic Places in Washington County, Pennsylvania
Road bridges on the National Register of Historic Places in Pennsylvania
Wooden bridges in Pennsylvania
Queen post truss bridges in the United States